Instant Sunshine can refer to:

 The comedy cabaret quartet
 An EP by British band Suede